Valea Runcului River may refer to the following rivers in Romania:

 Valea Runcului, a tributary of the Dâmbovița in Argeș County
 Valea Runcului, a tributary of the Iad in Bihor County